Glenn S. Anderson (born February 8, 1954) is a politician from the U.S. state of Michigan. He was a Democratic member of the Michigan Senate from 2007 to 2015 and the Michigan House of Representatives from 2001 to 2007. In the 2012 election, Anderson challenged U.S. House of Representatives member John Conyers in a primary election, after Conyers lost part of his district to redistricting after the 2010 U.S. Census.

Anderson lives in Westland with his wife Gail, where they have lived for over 37 years.  They have two adult children, Melissa and Kyle, and two grandchildren, Mackenzie and Logan.

Political career
Before entering public service, Anderson was employed by Ford Motor Company and has been a member of the UAW since 1972.  He has also been a licensed Realtor since 1979. Prior to his election to the Senate, Anderson represented Michigan's 18th District in the Michigan House of Representatives for six years. Before beginning his tenure in the legislature, Anderson served as Councilman for the City of Westland for nine years.

Over the years Senator Anderson has been active in a number of local organizations, including the Churchill High School PTA, Western Wayne NAACP, Westland Jaycees, Goodfellows, Rouge River Rescue, and Westland Hockey Association. Senator Anderson's focus as a legislator centered on ending bullying in schools, protecting children, strengthening consumer protection and state government transparency and reform of the redistricting process. Anderson was chosen as "Legislator of the Year" by the Michigan Association of Chiefs of Police, the Police Officers Association of Michigan, and the Michigan Hemophilia Association. In addition, he has been recognized by numerous other organizations for his legislative work including the Michigan Association of School Psychologists and the Michigan Municipal League.  Anderson is also an alumnus of the National Conference of State Legislature's Bowhay Institute for Legislative Leadership Development and Toll Fellowships.

Anderson was a member of the National Caucus of Environmental Legislators and the Council of State Governments Great Lakes Caucus throughout his legislative career. In 2014, Senator Anderson was invited by the British Embassy, along with four other state legislators from across the United States, to see first-hand the efforts of the United Kingdom to combat global warming.

Anderson left the State Senate on January 1, 2015, due to term limits.

References

External links
Michigan Senate - Glenn S. Anderson official government website
Project Vote Smart - Senator Glenn Anderson (MI) profile
Follow the Money - Glenn S Anderson
2006 2004 2002 2000  campaign contributions
Michigan Senate Democratic Caucus
Michigan Liberal - SD06

Michigan state senators
Members of the Michigan House of Representatives
1954 births
Living people
People from Carthage, Tennessee
People from Westland, Michigan
21st-century American politicians